Branko Buljevic (born 6 September 1947 in Split, Croatia, FPR Yugoslavia) is a former Australian soccer player. He was a member of the Australia 1974 World Cup squad in West Germany and represented Australia 30 times in total between 1972 and 1975.

Playing career
Buljevic began his club career with OFK Belgrade in the Yugoslav First League. He emigrated to Australia, where Buljevic spent nine seasons playing for Footscray JUST, then moving on to play for Heidelberg United and South Melbourne FC respectively. He returned to Footscray JUST for one more season before retiring in 1985.

After being naturalised, Buljevic made his debut for Australia in 1972.

References

External links
 

1947 births
Living people
Footballers from Split, Croatia
Australian people of Croatian descent
Australian soccer players
Australia international soccer players
1974 FIFA World Cup players
National Soccer League (Australia) players
Footscray JUST players
OFK Beograd players
Yugoslav First League players
South Melbourne FC players
Yugoslav emigrants to Australia
Association football forwards